Myron Jackson (born May 6, 1964) is a retired American professional basketball player who played briefly in the National Basketball Association (NBA). Born in Hamburg, Arkansas, he was a 6'3" (1.90 cm) 185 lb (84 kg) point guard and played collegiately at University of Arkansas at Little Rock.

Jackson was selected with the 15th pick of the fourth round in the 1986 NBA draft by the Dallas Mavericks. He played eight games for the Mavericks in the 1986-87 season, averaging 1.4 points, 0.4 rebounds and 0.8 assists per game.

External links
NBA stats @ basketballreference.com

1964 births
Living people
African-American basketball players
American men's basketball players
Basketball players from Arkansas
Dallas Mavericks draft picks
Dallas Mavericks players
La Crosse Catbirds players
Little Rock Trojans men's basketball players
People from Hamburg, Arkansas
Point guards
21st-century African-American people
20th-century African-American sportspeople